Kavkazsky (masculine), Kavkazskaya (feminine), or Kavkazskoye (neuter) is the name of several rural localities in Russia:
Kavkazsky, Karachay-Cherkess Republic, a settlement in Prikubansky District of the Karachay-Cherkess Republic
Kavkazsky, Stavropol Krai, a khutor in Sovetsky District of Stavropol Krai
Kavkazskaya (rural locality), a stanitsa in Kavkazsky District of Krasnodar Krai
Kavkazskoye, Krasnoyarsk Krai, a selo in Minusinsky District of Krasnoyarsk Krai
Kavkazskoye, Novosibirsk Oblast, a selo in Bagansky District of Novosibirsk Oblast

See also
Caucasus (disambiguation)
Caucasia (disambiguation)
Caucasian (disambiguation)